The 2012 Prince Edward Island Scotties Tournament of Hearts, Prince Edward Island's women's provincial curling championship, was held from January 20 to 23 at the Charlottetown Curling Club in Charlottetown, Prince Edward Island. The winning team of Kim Dolan represented Prince Edward Island at the 2012 Scotties Tournament of Hearts in Red Deer, Alberta, where her team finished with a 3-8 record.

Teams

Standings

* Hughes was awarded first place by virtue of a round robin win over Fullerton.

Results

Draw 1
January 20, 11:00 AM

Draw 2
January 20, 4:00 PM

Draw 3
January 21, 1:30 PM

Draw 4
January 21, 6:30 PM

Draw 5
January 22, 10:00 AM

Playoffs

Semifinal  
January 22, 3:00 PM

Final  
January 23, 6:30 PM

References

Prince Edward Island
Prince Edward Island Scotties Tournament of Hearts
Curling competitions in Charlottetown
2012 in Prince Edward Island